Ivorian Revolutionary Party was an Ivorian clandestine opposition group. It existed around 1959.

Sources
Gbagbo, Laurent: Côte d'Ivoire, Pour une alternative démocratique. Paris: L'Harmattan, 1983.
Defunct political parties in Ivory Coast
Political parties in French West Africa